Sudan Red G is a yellowish red lysochrome azo dye. It has the appearance of an odorless reddish-orange powder with melting point 225 °C. It is soluble in fats and used for coloring of fats, oils, and waxes, including the waxes used in turpentine-based polishes. It is also used in polystyrene, cellulose, and synthetic lacquers. It is insoluble in water. It is stable to temperatures of about 100–110 °C. It was formerly used as a food dye, but still appears to be used for this purpose in china. It is used in some temporary tattoos, where it can cause contact dermatitis. It is also used in hair dyes. It is a component of some newer formulas for red smoke signals and smoke-screens, together with Disperse Red 11.

Other Names
There are various names for Sudan Red G, including Brilliant Fat Scarlet R, C.I. Food Red 16, C.I. Solvent Red I, C.I. 12150, Ceres Red G, Fat Red BG, Fat Red G. Lacquer Red V2G, Oil Pink, Oil Scarlet 389, Oil Vermilion, Oil Red G, Oleal Red G, Plastoresin Red FR, Red GD, Resinol Red G, Silotras Red TG, Solvent Red 1, Sudan R, and amethoxybenzenazo-β-naphthol (MBN).

Toxicity & Safety Issues
According to European Food Safety Authority, Sudan Red G is considered genotoxic and/or carcinogenic.

References

Azo dyes
Food colorings
Sudan dyes
2-Naphthols
Phenol ethers